Kníř/Knirsch is a surname of Czech origin. The Czech "Kníř" was transposed to German as "Knirsch" or "Knirsh". The etymology can be traced to the Czech word "chmýří" (English translation: "fluff") being explained as a person with fine hair.

People with this surname include:

 Eduard Knirsch (? - 1955), an Austrian doctor and entomologist
 Hans Knirsch (1877–1933), a Moravian German activist

Czech-language surnames
German-language surnames
Surnames of Czech origin